The LabMag mine is a proposed iron mine near Schefferville in northern Quebec, Canada. LabMag is one of the largest iron ore reserves in the world, having estimated reserves of 5.74 billion tonnes of ore grading 29.4% iron metal.

See also 
 List of mines in Canada

References 

Iron mines in Canada